HMAS Bundaberg (J231/M231), named for the city of Bundaberg, Queensland, was one of 60 Bathurst-class corvettes constructed during World War II, and one of 36 initially manned and commissioned solely by the Royal Australian Navy (RAN).

Design and construction

In 1938, the Australian Commonwealth Naval Board (ACNB) identified the need for a general purpose 'local defence vessel' capable of both anti-submarine and mine-warfare duties, while easy to construct and operate. Construction of the prototype  did not go ahead, but the plans were retained. The need for locally built 'all-rounder' vessels at the start of World War II saw the "Australian Minesweepers" (designated as such to hide their anti-submarine capability, but popularly referred to as "corvettes") approved in September 1939, with 60 constructed during the course of the war: 36 (including Bundaberg) ordered by the RAN, 20 ordered by the British Admiralty but manned and commissioned as RAN vessels, and 4 for the Royal Indian Navy.

Bundaberg was laid down by Evans Deakin and Company at Brisbane on 7 June 1941, launched on 1 December 1941 by Mrs. Hurwood, wife of the Director of Evans Deakin, and commissioned on 12 September 1942.

Operational history
The ship was awarded the battle honours "Pacific 1942–45" and "New Guinea 1943–44" for her service during World War II.

Fate
Bundaberg paid off to reserve on 26 March 1946, and was sold for scrap to the Kinoshita Company of Japan on 6 January 1961.

Citations

References
Books

Journal and news articles

Bathurst-class corvettes of the Royal Australian Navy
Ships built in Queensland
1941 ships
World War II corvettes of Australia